Arthur Newton may refer to:
 Arthur Newton (cricketer) (1862–1952), Somerset and Oxford University cricketer
 Arthur F. H. Newton (1883–1959), British athlete
 Arthur L. Newton (1883–1956), American athlete
 Arthur Newton, a character in the film 12.10

See also
* A. P. Newton (Arthur Percival; 1873–1942), British historian
 A. Edward Newton (Arthur; 1864–1940), American writer, publisher and book collector
 A. Richard Newton (Arthur; 1951–2007), Australian-born American computer scientist